The Last Temptation of Christ may refer to:

 The Last Temptation of Christ (novel), a 1955 novel by Nikos Kazantzakis
 The Last Temptation of Christ (film), a 1988 film adaptation of the novel directed by Martin Scorsese with Willem Dafoe

See also
 Temptation of Christ, an event depicted in the gospels of Matthew, Mark and Luke